{{DISPLAYTITLE:C22H27NO3}}
The molecular formula C22H27NO3 (molar mass: 353.45 g/mol, exact mass: 353.1991 u) may refer to:

 Dioxaphetyl butyrate
 Oxpheneridine

Molecular formulas